The Russians are an East Slavic ethnic group indigenous to Eastern Europe, who share a common Russian ancestry, culture, and history. Russian, the most spoken Slavic language, is the shared mother tongue of the Russians; Orthodox Christianity has been their historical religion since 988 AD. They are the largest Slavic nation and the largest European nation.

The Russians were formed from East Slavic tribes, and their cultural ancestry is based in Kievan Rus'. Genetically, the majority of Russians are identical to their East and West Slavic counterparts; unlike northern Russians, who belong to the Northern European Baltic gene pool. The Russian word for the Russians is derived from the people of Rus' and the territory of Rus'. The Russians share many historical and cultural traits with other European peoples, and especially with other East Slavic ethnic groups, specifically Belarusians and Ukrainians.

Of the total 258 million speakers of Russian in the world, about 135 million of them are ethnic Russians. The vast majority of Russians live in native Russia, but notable minorities are scattered throughout other post-Soviet states such as Belarus, Kazakhstan, Moldova, Ukraine, and the Baltic states. A large Russian diaspora (sometimes including Russian-speaking non-Russians), estimated at around 25 million people, has developed all over the world, with notable numbers in the United States, Germany, Brazil, and Canada.

Ethnonym
The standard way to refer to citizens of Russia is "Russians" in English. There are two Russian words which are commonly translated into English as "Russians". One is "русские" (russkie), which in modern Russia most often means "ethnic Russians". Another is "россияне" (rossiyane), which denotes "Russian citizens", regardless of ethnicity or religious affiliation.

The name of the Russians derives from the early medieval Rus' people, a group of Norse merchants and warriors who relocated from across the Baltic Sea and founded a state centred on Novgorod that later became Kievan Rus'.

From the early nineteenth century, several politically charged theories of Russian nationality were developed, among them, the ideas of a single "all-Russian nation" encompassing the East Slavic peoples, or a "triune nation" of three brotherly "Great Russian", "Little Russian", and "White Russian" peoples.  Today some consider this as a colonial expression of Russian supremacy.  The common view of East Slavs today is of separate Belarusian, Russian, and Ukrainian nations.

History

Ancient history 

The ancestors of modern Russians are the Slavic tribes, whose original home is thought by some scholars to have been the wooded areas of the Pinsk Marshes, one of the largest wetlands in Europe. The East Slavs gradually settled Western Russia in two waves: one moving from Kiev toward present-day Suzdal and Murom and another from Polotsk toward Novgorod and Rostov. From the 7th century onwards, the East Slavs constituted the bulk of the population in western Russia, and, according to some scholars, slowly but peacefully assimilated the native Finnic peoples, including the Merya, the Muromians, and the Meshchera.

Outside archaeological remains, little is known about the predecessors to Russians in general prior to 859 AD, when the Primary Chronicle starts its records. By 600 AD, the Slavs are believed to have split linguistically into southern, western, and eastern branches.

Medieval history 

The traditional start-date of specifically Russian history is the establishment of the Rus' state in the north in 862 ruled by Vikings. Staraya Ladoga and Novgorod became the first major cities of the new union of immigrants from Scandinavia with the Slavs and Finns. In 882 Prince Oleg of Novgorod seized Kiev, thereby uniting the northern and southern lands of the Eastern Slavs under one authority. The state adopted Christianity from the Byzantine Empire in 988, beginning the synthesis of Byzantine and Slavic cultures that defined Orthodox Slavic culture for the next millennium. Kievan Rus' ultimately disintegrated as a state because of in-fighting between members of the princely family that ruled it collectively.

After the 13th century, Moscow became a political and cultural center. Moscow has become a center for the unification of Russian lands. By the end of the 15th century, Moscow united the northeastern and northwestern Russian principalities, in 1480 finally overthrew the Mongol yoke. The territories of the Grand Duchy of Moscow became the Tsardom of Russia in 1547.

Modern history 

In 1721 Tsar Peter the Great renamed his state as the Russian Empire, hoping to associate it with historical and cultural achievements of ancient Rus' – in contrast to his policies oriented towards Western Europe. The state now extended from the eastern borders of the Polish–Lithuanian Commonwealth to the Pacific Ocean, and became a great power; and one of the most powerful states in Europe after the victory over Napoleon. Peasant revolts were common, and all were fiercely suppressed. The Emperor Alexander II abolished Russian serfdom in 1861, but the peasants fared poorly and revolutionary pressures grew. In the following decades, reform efforts such as the Stolypin reforms of 1906–1914, the constitution of 1906, and the State Duma (1906–1917) attempted to open and liberalize the economy and political system, but the Emperors refused to relinquish autocratic rule and resisted sharing their power.

A combination of economic breakdown, war-weariness, and discontent with the autocratic system of government triggered revolution in Russia in 1917. The overthrow of the monarchy initially brought into office a coalition of liberals and moderate socialists, but their failed policies led to seizure of power by the communist Bolsheviks on 25 October 1917 (7 November New Style). In 1922, Soviet Russia, along with Soviet Ukraine, Soviet Belarus, and the Transcaucasian SFSR signed the Treaty on the Creation of the USSR, officially merging all four republics to form the Soviet Union as a country. Between 1922 and 1991 the history of Russia became essentially the history of the Soviet Union, effectively an ideologically-based state roughly conterminous with the Russian Empire before the 1918 Treaty of Brest-Litovsk. From its first years, government in the Soviet Union based itself on the one-party rule of the Communists, as the Bolsheviks called themselves, beginning in March 1918. The approach to the building of socialism, however, varied over different periods in Soviet history: from the mixed economy and diverse society and culture of the 1920s through the command economy and repressions of the Joseph Stalin era to the "era of stagnation" from the 1960s to the 1980s. During this period, the Soviet Union (along with its allies) won World War II, and then became a superpower opposing Western countries during the Cold War. The USSR developed a successful space program, achieving various 'firsts' including launching a cosmonaut into space.

By the mid-1980s, with Soviet economic and political weaknesses becoming acute, Soviet leader Mikhail Gorbachev embarked on major reforms; these culminated in the dissolution of the Soviet Union, leaving Russia again alone and marking the beginning of the post-Soviet Russian period. The Russian Soviet Federative Socialist Republic renamed itself the Russian Federation and became one of several successors to the Soviet Union.

Geographic distribution 
 

Ethnic Russians historically migrated within the areas of the former Russian Empire and Soviet Union, though they were sometimes encouraged to re-settle in borderland areas by the Tsarist and later Soviet government. Sometimes ethnic Russian communities, such as the Lipovans who settled in the Danube delta or the Doukhobors in Canada, emigrated as religious dissidents fleeing the central authority.

After the Russian Revolution and the Russian Civil War which started in 1917, many Russians left their homeland to flee the Bolshevik regime, and millions became refugees. Many white émigrés were participants in the White movement, although the term is broadly applied to anyone who may have left the country due to a change in regime.

After the Dissolution of the Soviet Union, an estimated 25 million Russians began living outside the Russian Federation, mostly in the former Soviet Republics. Most Russian re-settlement occurred in Ukraine (about 8 million), Kazakhstan (about 3.8 million), and Belarus (about 785,000), followed by the Baltic States (primarily including 520,000 in Latvia), Uzbekistan (about 650,000) and Kyrgyzstan (about 419,000). In Moldova, the Transnistria region (where 30.4% of the population is Russian) broke away from government control amid fears the country would soon reunite with Romania.

There are also small Russian communities in the Balkans — including Lipovans in the Danube delta — Central European nations such as Germany and Poland, as well as Russians settled in China, Japan, South Korea, Mexico, Brazil, Argentina and Australia. These communities identify themselves to varying degrees as Russians, citizens of these countries, or both.

Significant numbers of Russians emigrated to Canada, Australia and the United States. Brighton Beach, Brooklyn and South Beach, Staten Island in New York City are examples of large communities of recent Russian and Russian-Jewish immigrants. Other examples are Sunny Isles Beach, a northern suburb of Miami, and West Hollywood of the Los Angeles area.

After the Russian Revolution in 1917, many Russians who were identified with the White army moved to China — most of them settling in Harbin and Shanghai. By the 1930s, Harbin had 100,000 Russians. Many of these Russians moved back to the Soviet Union after World War II. Today, a large group in northern China still speak Russian as a second language. Russians (eluosizu) are one of the 56 ethnic groups officially recognized by the People's Republic of China (as the Russ); there are approximately 15,600 Russian Chinese living mostly in northern Xinjiang, and also in Inner Mongolia and Heilongjiang.

Ethnographic groups

Among the Russians, a number of ethnographic groups stand out, such as: the Northern Russians, the Southern Russians, the Cossacks, the Goryuns, the Kamchadals, the Polekhs, the Pomors, the Russian Chinese, the Siberians (Siberiaks), Starozhily, some groupings of Old Believers (Kamenschiks, Lipovans, Semeiskie), and others.

The main ones are the Northern and Southern Russian groups. At the same time, the proposal of the ethnographer Dmitry Zelenin in his major work of 1927 Russian (East Slavic) Ethnography to consider them as separate East Slavic peoples did not find support in scientific circles.

Genetics

In accordance with the 2008 research results of Russian and Estonian geneticists, two groups of the Russians are distinguished: the northern and southern populations.

The Central and Southern Russians, to which the majority of Russian populations belong, according to Y chromosome R1a, are included in the general "East European" gene cluster with the rest East and West Slavs (Slovaks and Czechs), as well as the non-Slavic Hungarians and Aromanians. Genetically, all Eastern Slavs are identical with Western Slavs; such genetic purity is somewhat unusual for genetics with such a wide settlement of the Slavs, especially the Russians. The high unity of the autosomal markers of the East Slavic populations and their significant differences from the neighboring Finnic, Turkic and Caucasian peoples were revealed.

The Northern Russians, according to mDNA, Y chromosome and autosomal marker CCR5de132, are included in the "North European" gene cluster (the Poles, the Balts, Germanic and Baltic Finnic peoples).

Consequently, the already existing biologo-genetic studies have made all hypotheses about the mixing of the Russians with non-Slavic ethnic groups or their "non-Slavism" obsolete or pseudoscientific. At the same time, the long-standing identification of the Northern Russian and Southern Russian ethnographic groups by ethnologists was confirmed. The previous conclusions of physical anthropologists, historians and linguists (see, in particular, the works of the academician Valentin Yanin) about the proximity of the ancient Novgorod Slavs and their language not to the East, but to west Baltic Slavs. As can be seen from genetic resources, the contemporary Northern Russians also are genetically close of all Slavic peoples only to the Poles and similar to the Balts. However, this does not mean the northern Russians origin from the Balts or the Poles, more likely, that all the peoples of the Nordic gene pool are descendants of Paleo-European population, which has remained around Baltic Sea.

Language

Russian is the official and the predominantly spoken language in Russia. It is the most spoken native language in Europe, the most geographically widespread language of Eurasia, as well as the world's most widely spoken Slavic language. Russian is the second-most used language on the Internet after English, and is one of two official languages aboard the International Space Station, as well as one of the six official languages of the United Nations.

Culture

Literature 
Russian literature is considered to be among the world's most influential and developed. It can be traced to the Middle Ages, when epics and chronicles in Old East Slavic were composed. By the Age of Enlightenment, literature had grown in importance, with works from Mikhail Lomonosov, Denis Fonvizin, Gavrila Derzhavin, and Nikolay Karamzin. From the early 1830s, during the Golden Age of Russian Poetry, literature underwent an astounding golden age in poetry, prose and drama. Romanticism permitted a flowering of poetic talent: Vasily Zhukovsky and later his protégé Alexander Pushkin came to the fore. Following Pushkin's footsteps, a new generation of poets were born, including Mikhail Lermontov, Nikolay Nekrasov, Aleksey Konstantinovich Tolstoy, Fyodor Tyutchev and Afanasy Fet.

The first great Russian novelist was Nikolai Gogol. Then came Ivan Turgenev, who mastered both short stories and novels. Fyodor Dostoevsky and Leo Tolstoy soon became internationally renowned. Ivan Goncharov is remembered mainly for his novel Oblomov. Mikhail Saltykov-Shchedrin wrote prose satire, while Nikolai Leskov is best remembered for his shorter fiction. In the second half of the century Anton Chekhov excelled in short stories and became a leading dramatist. Other important 19th-century developments included the fabulist Ivan Krylov, non-fiction writers such as the critic Vissarion Belinsky, and playwrights such as Aleksandr Griboyedov and Aleksandr Ostrovsky. The beginning of the 20th century ranks as the Silver Age of Russian Poetry. This era had poets such as Alexander Blok, Anna Akhmatova, Boris Pasternak, Konstantin Balmont, Marina Tsvetaeva, Vladimir Mayakovsky, and Osip Mandelshtam. It also produced some first-rate novelists and short-story writers, such as Aleksandr Kuprin, Nobel Prize winner Ivan Bunin, Leonid Andreyev, Yevgeny Zamyatin, Dmitry Merezhkovsky and Andrei Bely.

After the Russian Revolution of 1917, Russian literature split into Soviet and white émigré parts. In the 1930s, Socialist realism became the predominant trend in Russia. Its leading figure was Maxim Gorky, who laid the foundations of this style. Mikhail Bulgakov was one of the leading writers of the Soviet era. Nikolay Ostrovsky's novel How the Steel Was Tempered has been among the most successful works of Russian literature. Influential émigré writers include Vladimir Nabokov, and Isaac Asimov; who was considered one of the "Big Three" science fiction writers. Some writers dared to oppose Soviet ideology, such as Nobel Prize-winning novelist Aleksandr Solzhenitsyn, who wrote about life in the Gulag camps.

Philosophy 

Russian philosophy has been greatly influential. Alexander Herzen is known as one of the fathers of agrarian populism. Mikhail Bakunin is referred to as the father of anarchism. Peter Kropotkin was the most important theorist of anarcho-communism. Mikhail Bakhtin's writings have significantly inspired scholars. Helena Blavatsky gained international following as the leading theoretician of Theosophy, and co-founded the Theosophical Society. Vladimir Lenin, a major revolutionary, developed a variant of communism known as Leninism. Leon Trotsky, on the other hand, founded Trotskyism. Alexander Zinoviev was a prominent philosopher in the second half of the 20th century.

Science 

Russia's research and development budget is the world's ninth-highest, with an expenditure of approximately 422 billion rubles on domestic research and development. In 2019, Russia was ranked tenth worldwide in the number of scientific publications. Russia ranked 45th in the Global Innovation Index in 2021. Since 1904, Nobel Prize were awarded to twenty-six Soviets and Russians in physics, chemistry, medicine, economy, literature and peace.

Mikhail Lomonosov proposed the conservation of mass in chemical reactions, discovered the atmosphere of Venus, and founded modern geology. Since the times of Nikolay Lobachevsky, who pioneered the non-Euclidean geometry, and a prominent tutor Pafnuty Chebyshev, Russian mathematicians became among the world's most influential. Dmitry Mendeleev invented the Periodic table, the main framework of modern chemistry. Sofya Kovalevskaya was a pioneer among women in mathematics in the 19th century. Nine Soviet/Russian mathematicians have been awarded with the Fields Medal. Grigori Perelman was offered the first ever Clay Millennium Prize Problems Award for his final proof of the Poincaré conjecture in 2002, as well as the Fields Medal in 2006, both of which he infamously declined.

Alexander Popov was among the inventors of radio, while Nikolai Basov and Alexander Prokhorov were co-inventors of laser and maser. Zhores Alferov contributed significantly to the creation of modern heterostructure physics and electronics. Oleg Losev made crucial contributions in the field of semiconductor junctions, and discovered light-emitting diodes. Vladimir Vernadsky is considered one of the founders of geochemistry, biogeochemistry, and radiogeology. Élie Metchnikoff is known for his groundbreaking research in immunology. Ivan Pavlov is known chiefly for his work in classical conditioning. Lev Landau made fundamental contributions to many areas of theoretical physics.

Nikolai Vavilov was best known for having identified the centers of origin of cultivated plants. Trofim Lysenko was known mainly for Lysenkoism. Many famous Russian scientists and inventors were émigrés. Igor Sikorsky was an aviation pioneer. Vladimir Zworykin was the inventor of the iconoscope and kinescope television systems. Theodosius Dobzhansky was the central figure in the field of evolutionary biology for his work in shaping the modern synthesis. George Gamow was one of the foremost advocates of the Big Bang theory. Many foreign scientists lived and worked in Russia for a long period, such as Leonard Euler and Alfred Nobel.

Space exploration 

Roscosmos is Russia's national space agency. The country's achievements in the field of space technology and space exploration can be traced back to Konstantin Tsiolkovsky, the father of theoretical astronautics, whose works had inspired leading Soviet rocket engineers, such as Sergey Korolyov, Valentin Glushko, and many others who contributed to the success of the Soviet space program in the early stages of the Space Race and beyond.

In 1957, the first Earth-orbiting artificial satellite, Sputnik 1, was launched. In 1961, the first human trip into space was successfully made by Yuri Gagarin. Many other Soviet and Russian space exploration records ensued. In 1963, Valentina Tereshkova became the first and youngest woman in space, having flown a solo mission on Vostok 6. In 1965, Alexei Leonov became the first human to conduct a spacewalk, exiting the space capsule during Voskhod 2.

In 1957, Laika, a Soviet space dog, became the first animal to orbit the Earth, aboard Sputnik 2. In 1966, Luna 9 became the first spacecraft to achieve a survivable landing on a celestial body, the Moon. In 1968, Zond 5 brought the first Earthlings (two tortoises and other life forms) to circumnavigate the Moon. In 1970, Venera 7 became the first spacecraft to land on another planet, Venus. In 1971, Mars 3 became the first spacecraft to land on Mars. During the same period, Lunokhod 1 became the first space exploration rover, while Salyut 1 became the world's first space station. Russia had 176 active satellites in space in 2021, the world's third-highest.

Music 

Until the 18th-century, music in Russia consisted mainly of church music and folk songs and dances. In the 19th-century, it was defined by the tension between classical composer Mikhail Glinka along with other members of The Mighty Handful, and the Russian Musical Society led by composers Anton and Nikolay Rubinstein. The later tradition of Pyotr Ilyich Tchaikovsky, one of the greatest composers of the Romantic era, was continued into the 20th century by Sergei Rachmaninoff, one of the last great champions of the Romantic style of European classical music. World-renowned composers of the 20th century include Alexander Scriabin, Alexander Glazunov, Igor Stravinsky, Sergei Prokofiev, Dmitri Shostakovich, Georgy Sviridov and Alfred Schnittke.

Soviet and Russian conservatories have turned out generations of world-renowned soloists. Among the best known are violinists David Oistrakh and Gidon Kremer, cellist Mstislav Rostropovich, pianists Vladimir Horowitz, Sviatoslav Richter, and Emil Gilels, and vocalist Galina Vishnevskaya.

During the Soviet times, popular music also produced a number of renowned figures, such as the two balladeers—Vladimir Vysotsky and Bulat Okudzhava, and performers such as Alla Pugacheva. Jazz, even with sanctions from Soviet authorities, flourished and evolved into one of the country's most popular musical forms. The Ganelin Trio have been described by critics as the greatest ensemble of free-jazz in continental Europe. By the 1980s, rock music became popular across Russia, and produced bands such as Aria, Aquarium, DDT, and Kino. Pop music in Russia has continued to flourish since the 1960s, with globally famous acts such as t.A.T.u. In the recent times, Little Big, a rave band, has gained popularity in Russia and across Europe.

Cinema 

Russian and later Soviet cinema was a hotbed of invention, resulting in world-renowned films such as The Battleship Potemkin. Soviet-era filmmakers, most notably Sergei Eisenstein and Andrei Tarkovsky, would go on to become among of the world's most innovative and influential directors. Eisenstein was a student of Lev Kuleshov, who developed the groundbreaking Soviet montage theory of film editing at the world's first film school, the All-Union Institute of Cinematography. Dziga Vertov's "Kino-Eye" theory had a huge impact on the development of documentary filmmaking and cinema realism. Many Soviet socialist realism films were artistically successful, including Chapaev, The Cranes Are Flying, and Ballad of a Soldier.

The 1960s and 1970s saw a greater variety of artistic styles in Soviet cinema. The comedies of Eldar Ryazanov and Leonid Gaidai of that time were immensely popular, with many of the catchphrases still in use today. In 1961–68 Sergey Bondarchuk directed an Oscar-winning film adaptation of Leo Tolstoy's epic War and Peace, which was the most expensive film made in the Soviet Union. In 1969, Vladimir Motyl's White Sun of the Desert was released, a very popular film in a genre of ostern; the film is traditionally watched by cosmonauts before any trip into space. In 2002, Russian Ark was the first feature film ever to be shot in a single take. Today, the Russian cinema industry continues to expand.

Architecture 

The history of Russian architecture begins with early woodcraft buildings of ancient Slavs, and the architecture of Kievan Rus'. Following the Christianization of Kievan Rus', for several centuries it was influenced predominantly by the Byzantine Empire. Aristotle Fioravanti and other Italian architects brought Renaissance trends into Russia. The 16th-century saw the development of the unique tent-like churches; and the onion dome design, which is a distinctive feature of Russian architecture. In the 17th-century, the "fiery style" of ornamentation flourished in Moscow and Yaroslavl, gradually paving the way for the Naryshkin baroque of the 1690s. After the reforms of Peter the Great, Russia's architecture became influenced by Western European styles. The 18th-century taste for Rococo architecture led to the splendid works of Bartolomeo Rastrelli and his followers. During the reign of Catherine the Great, Saint Petersburg was transformed into an outdoor museum of Neoclassical architecture. During Alexander I's rule, Empire style became the de facto architectural style, and Nicholas I opened the gate of Eclecticism to Russia. The second half of the 19th-century was dominated by the Neo-Byzantine and Russian Revival style. In early 20th-century, Russian neoclassical revival became a trend. Prevalent styles of the late 20th-century were the Art Nouveau, Constructivism, and Socialist Classicism.

Religion 
 
Russia's largest religion is Christianity—It has the world's largest Orthodox population. As of a different sociological surveys on religious adherence; between 41% to over 80% of the total population of Russia adhere to the Russian Orthodox Church.

Non-religious Russians may associate themselves with the Orthodox faith for cultural reasons. Some Russian people are Old Believers: a relatively small schismatic group of the Russian Orthodoxy that rejected the liturgical reforms introduced in the 17th century. Other schisms from Orthodoxy include Doukhobors which in the 18th century rejected secular government, the Russian Orthodox priests, icons, all church ritual, the Bible as the supreme source of divine revelation and the divinity of Jesus, and later emigrated into Canada. An even earlier sect were Molokans which formed in 1550 and rejected Czar's divine right to rule, icons, the Trinity as outlined by the Nicene Creed, Orthodox fasts, military service, and practices including water baptism.

Other world religions have negligible representation among ethnic Russians. The largest of these groups are Islam with over 100,000 followers from national minorities, and Baptists with over 85,000 Russian adherents. Others are mostly Pentecostals, Evangelicals, Seventh-day Adventists, Lutherans and Jehovah's Witnesses.

Since the fall of the Soviet Union various new religious movements have sprung up and gathered a following among ethnic Russians. The most prominent of these are Rodnovery, the revival of the Slavic native religion also common to other Slavic nations, Another movement, very small in comparison to other new religions, is Vissarionism, a syncretic group with an Orthodox Christian background.

Sports 

Football is the most popular sport in Russia. The Soviet Union national football team became the first European champions by winning Euro 1960, and reached the finals of Euro 1988. In 1956 and 1988, the Soviet Union won gold at the Olympic football tournament. Russian clubs CSKA Moscow and Zenit Saint Petersburg won the UEFA Cup in 2005 and 2008. The Russian national football team reached the semi-finals of Euro 2008. Russia was the host nation for the 2017 FIFA Confederations Cup, and the 2018 FIFA World Cup.

Ice hockey is very popular in Russia. The Soviet Union men's national ice hockey team dominated the sport internationally throughout its existence, and the modern-day Russia men's national ice hockey team is among the most successful teams in the sport. Bandy is Russia's national sport, and it has historically been the highest-achieving country in the sport. The Russian national basketball team won the EuroBasket 2007, and the Russian basketball club PBC CSKA Moscow is among the most successful European basketball teams. The annual Formula One Russian Grand Prix is held at the Sochi Autodrom in the Sochi Olympic Park.

Historically, Russian athletes have been one of the most successful contenders in the Olympic Games, ranking second in an all-time Olympic Games medal count. Russia is the leading nation in rhythmic gymnastics; and Russian synchronized swimming is considered to be the world's best. Figure skating is another popular sport in Russia, especially pair skating and ice dancing. Russia has produced a number of famous tennis players. Chess is also a widely popular pastime in the nation, with many of the world's top chess players being Russian for decades. The 1980 Summer Olympic Games were held in Moscow, and the 2014 Winter Olympics and the 2014 Winter Paralympics were hosted in Sochi.

See also

 All-Russian nation
 European ethnic groups
 List of Russian artists
 List of Slavic studies journals

Notelist

References

Citations

Bibliography
  (pdf)

External links

 
  4.1. Population by nationality 
  "People and Cultures: Russians" book published by Russian Academy of Sciences
 Pre-Revolutionary photos of women in Russian folk dress

Russian people
Ethnic groups in Russia
Slavic ethnic groups